XHQT-FM is a radio station in Veracruz, Veracruz, Mexico. It broadcasts on 106.9 FM and is known as La Poderosa. The station is jointly owned by Grupo Radiorama (the Pérez family) and the Ferráez family of Avanradio.

History
Carlos Ferraez Matos received the concession for XEQT-AM, then on 1600 kHz, on July 30, 1969. The station was known as La Pantera when it signed on two days later. In November 1994, the FM combo station was authorized, and in the 2000s, the station moved to 800 kHz on AM.

The AM frequency was turned off on May 12, 2022.

References

Radio stations in Veracruz
Radio stations established in 1994